Viyeh (also Romanized as Vīyeh, Veyeh, Viāh, and Vīyāh; also known as Viakh) is a village in Kalisham Rural District, Amarlu District, Rudbar County, Gilan Province, Iran. At the 2006 census, its population was 272, in 92 families.

References 

Populated places in Rudbar County